The term Defence Command means the joint military headquarters in some countries. For more information, see
Defence Command (Denmark)
Defence Command (Finland)